Everett Nelson, nicknamed "Ace", was an American Negro league pitcher in the 1930s.

Nelson posted a 4–1 record in 56.1 innings of work for the Montgomery Grey Sox in 1932. The following season, he pitched for the Indianapolis ABCs.

References

External links
 and Seamheads

Year of birth missing
Year of death missing
Place of birth missing
Place of death missing
Indianapolis ABCs (1931–1933) players
Montgomery Grey Sox players